National Route 179 is a national highway of Japan connecting Himeji, Hyōgo and Yurihama, Tottori in Japan, with a total length of 158.7 km (98.61 mi).

History
Route 179 originally ran from Tsuyama to Chizu. This was redesignated as Route 53 in 1963.

References

National highways in Japan
Roads in Hyōgo Prefecture
Roads in Okayama Prefecture
Roads in Tottori Prefecture